A fishing net is a net used for fishing. Nets are devices made from fibers woven in a grid-like structure. Some fishing nets are also called fish traps, for example fyke nets. Fishing nets are usually meshes formed by knotting a relatively thin thread. Early nets were woven from grasses, flaxes and other fibrous plant material. Later cotton was used. Modern nets are usually made of artificial polyamides like nylon, although nets of organic polyamides such as wool or silk thread were common until recently and are still used.

History

Fishing nets have been used widely in the past, including by stone age societies. The oldest known fishing net is the net of Antrea, found with other fishing equipment in the Karelian town of Antrea, Finland, in 1913. The net was made from willow, and dates back to 8300 BC. Recently, fishing net sinkers from 27,000 BC were discovered in Korea, making them the oldest fishing implements discovered, to date, in the world. The remnants of another fishing net dates back to the late Mesolithic, and were found together with sinkers at the bottom of a former sea. Some of the oldest rock carvings at Alta (4200–500 BC) have mysterious images, including intricate patterns of horizontal and vertical lines sometimes explained as fishing nets. American Native Indians on the Columbia River wove seine nets from spruce root fibers or wild grass, again using stones as weights. For floats they used sticks made of cedar which moved in a way which frightened the fish and helped keep them together. With the help of large canoes, pre-European Maori deployed seine nets which could be over one thousand metres long. The nets were woven from green flax, with stone weights and light wood or gourd floats, and could require hundreds of men to haul.

Fishing nets are well documented in antiquity. They appear in Egyptian tomb paintings from 3000 BC. In ancient Roman literature, Ovid makes many references to fishing nets, including the use of cork floats and lead weights. Pictorial evidence of Roman fishing comes from mosaics which show nets. In a parody of fishing, a type of gladiator called retiarius was armed with a trident and a cast net. He would fight against a secutor or the murmillo, who carried a short sword and a helmet with the image of a fish on the front. Between 177 and 180 the Greek author Oppian wrote the Halieutica, a didactic poem about fishing. He described various means of fishing including the use of nets cast from boats, scoop nets held open by a hoop, and various traps "which work while their masters sleep". Here is Oppian's description of fishing with a "motionless" net:
The fishers set up very light nets of buoyant flax and wheel in a circle round about while they violently strike the surface of the sea with their oars and make a din with sweeping blow of poles. At the flashing of the swift oars and the noise the fish bound in terror and rush into the bosom of the net which stands at rest, thinking it to be a shelter: foolish fishes which, frightened by a noise, enter the gates of doom. Then the fishers on either side hasten with the ropes to draw the net ashore.

In Norse mythology the sea giantess Rán uses a fishing net to trap lost sailors. References to fishing nets can also be found in the New Testament. Jesus Christ was reputedly a master in the use of fishing nets. The tough, fibrous inner bark of the pawpaw was used by Native Americans and settlers in the Midwest for making ropes and fishing nets. The archaeological site at León Viejo (1524–1610) has fishing net artifacts including fragments of pottery used as weights for fishing nets.

Fishing nets have not evolved greatly, and many contemporary fishing nets would be recognized for what they are in Neolithic times. However, the fishing lines from which the nets are constructed have hugely evolved. Fossilised fragments of "probably two-ply laid rope of about 7 mm diameter" have been found in one of the caves at Lascaux, dated about 15,000 BC. Egyptian rope dates back to 4000 to 3500 BC and was generally made of water reed fibers. Other rope in antiquity was made from the fibers of date palms, flax, grass, papyrus, leather, or animal hair. Rope made of hemp fibres was in use in China from about 2800 BC. 

In modern times, hemp was almost the only material in large scale use in fishing gear until 1900 when it found competition from cotton. By 1950s cotton had taken over a large fraction of fishing nets, although hemp nets were still in use in large quantities. The first nylon fishing nets emerged in Japan in 1949 (although tests of similar equipment were taking place around the world in the last years of the 1940s). In the 1950s they were adopted worldwide, replacing nets made from cotton or hemp that were used before. The introduction of synthetic fibres in fishing gear from around 1950 changed a way of using natural materials that goes back several thousands of years. In the following decades (for example in Norway in 1975, 95% of all fishing gear was made of synthetic fibre), the new synthetic materials conquered the hegemony in net fishing.

Types

Fishing lines

Ropes and lines are made of fibre lengths, twisted or braided together to provide tensile strength. They are used for pulling, but not for pushing. The availability of reliable and durable ropes and lines has had many consequences for the development and utility of fishing nets, and influences particularly the scale at which the nets can be deployed.

 Twine
 Braided fishing line
 Multifilament fishing line
 Monofilament fishing line
 Fishing line
 Manila rope
 Abacá rope

Floats

Some types of fishing nets, like seine and trammel, need to be kept hanging vertically in the water by means of floats at the top. Various light "corkwood"-type woods have been used around the world as fishing floats. Floats come in different sizes and shapes. These days they are often brightly coloured so they are easy to see.

 Small floats were usually made of cork, but fishermen in places where cork was not available used other materials, like birch bark in Sweden, Finland, and Russia, as well as the pneumatophores of mangrove apple in Southeast Asia. These materials have now largely been replaced by plastic foam.
 Subsistence fishermen in some areas of Southeast Asia make corks for fishing nets by shaping the pneumatophores of mangrove apple into small floats.
Across the Indo-Pacific ocean, many Subsistence fishermen utilise discarded flip-flops as floats. This is especially common in the Western Indian Ocean on drag nets made from mosquito nets.
 Entelea: The wood was used by Māori for the floats of fishing nets
 Native Hawaiians made fishing net floats from low density wiliwili wood.
 Glass floats were large glass balls for long oceanic nets, now substituted by hard plastic. They are used not only to keep fishing nets afloat, but also for dropline and longline fishing. Often larger floats have marker flags for easier spotting.
 Glass floats are popular collectors' items.  They were once used by fishermen in many parts of the world to keep fishing nets, as well as longlines or droplines afloat.

Weights and anchors
The Cucuteni–Trypillia culture,  BC to 2750 BC in Eastern Europe, created ceramic weights in various shapes and sizes which were used as loom weights when weaving, and also were attached to fishing nets.

Despite their ornamental value, dog conches are traditionally used by local fishermen as sinkers for their fishing nets.

Production

Fishing nets are usually manufactured on industrial looms, though traditional methods are still used where the nets are woven by hand and assembled in home or cottage industries.

Environmental impact
Fisheries often use large-scale nets that are indiscriminate and catch whatever comes along; sea turtle, dolphin, or shark. Bycatch is a large contributor to sea turtle deaths. Longline, trawl, and gillnet fishing are three types of fishing with the most sea turtle accidents.  Deaths occur often because of drowning, where the sea turtle was ensnared and could not come up for air. Cubs of endangered Saimaa ringed seal also drown to fishing nets.

Fishing nets, usually made of plastic, can be left or lost in the ocean by fishermen. Known as ghost nets, these entangle fish, whales, dolphins, sea turtles, sharks, dugongs, crocodiles, seabirds, crabs, and other creatures, restricting movement, causing starvation, laceration and infection, and, in those that need to return to the surface to breathe, suffocation.

Miscellany

Divers may become trapped in fishing nets; monofilament is almost invisible underwater. Divers often carry a net cutter. This is a small handheld tool carried by scuba divers to extricate themselves if trapped by a fishing net or fishing line. It has a small sharp blade such as a replaceable scalpel blade inside the small notch. There is a small hole at the other end to for a lanyard to tether the cutter to the diver.

Gallery

See also

 Fish trap
 Fishnet (material)
 Miraculous catch of fish

Notes

References
 Fridman AL and Carrothers PJG (1986) ''Calculations for fishing gear designs" (FAO fishing manual), Fishing News Books. 
 Klust, Gerhard (1982) Netting materials for fishing gear FAO Fishing Manuals, Fishing News Books. . Download PHP (9MB)
 Prado J and Dremière PY (eds.) (1990) Fisherman's workbook FAO, Rome. .
 von Brandt A (1984) Fish catching methods of the world Wiley-Blackwell. .

External links

 Basic net design: Gill nets

!